Phyllis Chanez Francis (born May 4, 1992) is an American track and field athlete. She won the gold medal at the 2017 World Championships in the 400 metres and 4×400 metres relay events.

Prep
Francis was a student at Catherine McAuley High School (Brooklyn) and the University of Oregon, class of 2014.

NCAA
She is the American and Collegiate indoor 400-meter record holder, breaking Olympian Francena McCorory's 2010 record while winning the 2014 NCAA Women's Indoor Track and Field Championship. She is the first Woman to win a 400-meter National NCAA Championship for the University of Oregon, in its history.

Professional

2016 Olympics
Francis placed second in 400 m running a personal best time 49.94 behind Team USA teammates Allyson Felix, ahead of Natasha Hastings at 2016 United States Olympic Trials (track and field) and represented United States at Athletics at the 2016 Summer Olympics where she placed 5th in the women's 400 m final and won a gold medal in 4x400 meters.

2017 World Championships
In 2017, Francis became the 400 m world champion by beating Allyson Felix – the defending world champion, and Shaunae Miller-Uibo – the Olympic champion at the 2017 World Championships in London, Great Britain. Her winning time of 49.92 seconds was a new personal best for Francis. Four days later, she won her second gold medal by anchoring the US women's 4 × 400 metres relay team to victory.

International competitions

1: Competed only in the heat.

References

External links

Living people
1992 births
Oregon Ducks women's track and field athletes
Track and field athletes from New York City
American female sprinters
African-American female track and field athletes
World Athletics Championships athletes for the United States
World Athletics Championships medalists
Athletes (track and field) at the 2016 Summer Olympics
Olympic gold medalists for the United States in track and field
Medalists at the 2016 Summer Olympics
World Athletics Championships winners
USA Indoor Track and Field Championships winners
Olympic female sprinters
21st-century African-American sportspeople
21st-century African-American women